Neptis nata, the clear sailer or dirty sailer, is a species of nymphalid butterfly found in south and southeast Asia.

Description

References

nata
Butterflies of Indochina
Butterflies described in 1857